Xanthonia angulata is a species of leaf beetle. It is found in North America. It is associated with oaks. The specific name comes from the Latin angulatus, meaning "with angles".

Distribution
X. angulata is distributed from Maryland to Kansas. It has also been recorded from Arkansas, Oklahoma and Texas.

References

Further reading

 

Eumolpinae
Articles created by Qbugbot
Beetles described in 2001
Beetles of the United States